Darren Barton (born 12 November 1974) is a British professional motorcycling rider who competed in 125cc Grand Prix 1994–7 and was the 1995, 1997 and 1999 Supercup champion.

References

External links
Article from the Lancashire Evening Telegraph, first published Tuesday 28 April 1998.
Profile on MotoGP.com

British motorcycle racers
1974 births
Living people
125cc World Championship riders